The Miners' Way and Historical Trail is a long-distance trail in Ireland. It is typically completed in five days. It is designated as a National Waymarked Trail by the National Trails Office of the Irish Sports Council and is managed by Roscommon Integrated Development Company, Roscommon County Council, Leitrim County Council and Sligo County Council. The trail was developed to encourage tourism in the area in the wake of the closure of the Arigna mines in 1990. The route was originally conceived by a local priest, Father Sean Tynan, and built with funding from the European Regional Development Fund. The trail was opened by broadcaster Donncha Ó Dúlaing in July 2000. 

The trail consists of three looped routes that travel through neighbouring parts of Counties Roscommon, Leitrim and Sligo. A third trail makes a circuit of Lough Allen via Drumkeeran, Dowra and Drumshanbo. 

Parts of the Miners' Way and Historical Trail also form part of the Beara-Breifne Way, a walking and cycling route under development, intended to run from the Beara Peninsula, County Cork to Breifne, County Leitrim following the line of Donal Cam O'Sullivan Beare's march in the aftermath of the Battle of Kinsale in 1602.

References

Notes

Bibliography

External links
 Miners' Way and Historical Trail at IrishTrails.ie
 Miners Way and Historical Trail - Route Map and Guide at ActiveMe.ie 

Geography of County Roscommon
Geography of County Leitrim
Geography of County Sligo 
Tourist attractions in County Roscommon
Tourist attractions in County Leitrim
Tourist attractions in County Sligo
Long-distance trails in the Republic of Ireland